City Confidential is a documentary television series where a different city is featured in a high-profile criminal case. The shows were narrated by Paul Winfield and then Keith David. 11 seasons have been broadcast from 1998-2005 on the A&E Network. The episode numbering is as provided by A&E's official website's episode guide.

Season 1

Season 2

Season 3

Season 4

Season 5

Season 6

Season 7

Season 8

Season 9

Season 10

Season 11

Season 12

References

External links
 City Confidential Episode Guide at A&E
 City Confidential Episodes List at TV Guide

City Confidential